The UPI College Basketball Player of the Year was an annual basketball award given to the best men's basketball player in NCAA Division I competition. The award was first given following the 1954–55 season and was discontinued following the 1995–96 season. It was given by United Press International (UPI), a news agency in the United States that rivaled the Associated Press but began to decline with the advent of television news.

Five players—Oscar Robertson, Jerry Lucas, Lew Alcindor, Bill Walton and Ralph Sampson—won the award multiple times. Of these five, only Robertson, Walton and Sampson were three-time UPI Players of the Year.

UCLA had the most all-time winners with six. Ohio State was second with four winners, while Cincinnati and Virginia were tied for third with three winners apiece. Five other schools had two winners and sixteen schools had only one UPI Player of the Year.

Eight of the winners were sophomores, seven were juniors, and the remaining 27 were seniors. No freshman was ever presented the award.

Key

Winners

Winners by school

Notes 
 Lew Alcindor changed his name to Kareem Abdul-Jabbar in 1971 after converting to Islam.

See also
List of U.S. men's college basketball national player of the year awards

References 

General sources

College basketball player of the year awards in the United States
Awards established in 1955
Awards disestablished in 1996
1955 establishments in the United States